Clermont, Regina Maria Roche's 1798 novel, "...is arguably the definitive text of the Gothic novel craze during the eighteenth and nineteenth centuries". It was first published by Minerva Press.

Plot 

Clermont relates the story of the beautiful Madeline, who lives in seclusion with her eponymous father until they are visited by a mysterious Countess from Clermont's past.

Madeline travels to complete her education, accompanied by the Countess.   A series of assaults by shadowy foes cannot dissuade Madeline from unraveling the mystery of her father's past and pursuing her paramour, De Sevignie.  Madeline uncovers the secret of her own noble origins and her virtue proves its strength through a series of trials and tribulations.

Literary allusions
The novel was one of the seven "horrid novels" recommended by the character Isabella Thorpe in Jane Austen's novel Northanger Abbey:
Dear creature! How much I am obliged to you; and when you have finished Udolpho, we will read the Italian together; and I have made out a list of ten or twelve more of the same kind for you.

Have you, indeed! How glad I am! What are they all?

I will read you their names directly; here they are, in my pocketbook. Castle of Wolfenbach, Clermont, Mysterious Warnings, Necromancer of the Black Forest, Midnight Bell, Orphan of the Rhine, and Horrid Mysteries. Those will last us some time.

Yes, pretty well; but are they all horrid, are you sure they are all horrid?

—Northanger Abbey, ch. 6

Though Clermont, as well as the other "horrid novels", were once thought to be the creations of Jane Austen's imagination, research in the first half of the 20th century by Michael Sadleir and Montague Summers confirmed that they did actually exist and stimulated renewed interest in the Gothic.

References

Sources

 Roche, Regina Maria. Clermont, (Natalie Schroeder, ed.) Valancourt Books]]

Editions 
1968, London: Folio Press
2005, Valancourt Press 

1798 novels
English Gothic novels
18th-century Irish novels